The 1975 Czechoslovak Figure Skating Championships was held on January 11–12 in Havirov. Medals were awarded in the disciplines of men's singles, ladies' singles, pair skating, and ice dancing.

Results

Men

Ladies

Pairs

Ice dancing

Sources
 Rude Pravo Archiv, 13.01.1975, Page 8

Czechoslovak Figure Skating Championships